Adam Hughes (born 1 October 1977) is an English professional rugby league and rugby union footballer who played in the 1990s and 2000s.

Background
Hughes was born in Leeds, West Yorkshire, England.

Playing career

International honours
Hughes won caps for Wales (RL) in 2002 against New Zealand, in 2003 against Russia, and Australia, in 2004 against Ireland. and Scotland, in 2005 against Scotland, and France, in 2006 against Scotland, and in 2007 against Papua New Guinea, Scotland, and Lebanon. Hughes won his caps for Wales while at Widnes, Leigh, and Oldham 2002–2007 13(11?)-caps.

First Division Grand Final appearances
Hughes played left-, i.e. number 4, in Wakefield Trinity's 24–22 victory over Featherstone Rovers in the 1998 First Division Grand Final at McAlpine Stadium, Huddersfield on Saturday 26 September 1998.

Championship Cup Final appearances
Hughes played right-, i.e. number 3, in Leigh Centurions' 22–18 victory over Hull Kingston Rovers in the 2006 Northern Rail Cup Final at Bloomfield Road, Blackpool on Sunday 16 July 2006.

Genealogical information
Adam Hughes is the younger brother of the rugby league footballer; Ian Hughes.

References

External links
Statistics at rugby.widnes.tv
(archived by web.archive.org) Wales All time records
(archived by web.archive.org) Profile at leedsrugby
2001 Super League Team-by-team guide
Search for "Adam Hughes" AND "Rugby League" at BBC – Sport
Hughes Sox it to Tigers
Wales wait on Hughes' hand injury
Vikings leave Wildcats trailing
Widnes hold off Wolves
Hughes tipped for honours
Kelly hails Vikings duo
Widnes edge Leeds
Widnes fuel Wakefield woes
Vikings out of the Frame
Vikings humble Halifax
In the hot-seat: Adam Hughes
Hughes seeks Rhinos revenge

1977 births
Living people
Barrow Raiders players
English people of Welsh descent
English rugby league players
English rugby union players
Footballers who switched code
Halifax R.L.F.C. players
Leeds Rhinos players
Leeds Tykes players
Leigh Leopards players
Oldham R.L.F.C. players
Rugby league centres
Rugby league players from Leeds
Rugby league wingers
Rugby union players from Leeds
Wakefield Trinity players
Wales national rugby league team players
Widnes Vikings players